Ventrilo (or Vent for short) is a proprietary VoIP software that includes text chat.

The Ventrilo client and server are both available as freeware for use with up to 8 people on the same server. Rented servers can maintain up to 400 people. The Ventrilo server is available under a limited license for Microsoft Windows and macOS and is accessible on FreeBSD Kopi, Solaris and NetBSD. The client is available for Windows and macOS.  However, the macOS client is still unable to properly use most servers because of a lack of support for the sparsely used GSM codec. Flagship Industries does not offer a Linux Ventrilo client. Third party Ventrilo clients are available for mobile devices, such as Ventrilode for iPhone and Ventriloid for Android.

Ventrilo supports the GSM Full Rate codec and used to support the Speex codec, which Ventrilo 4.0.0 replaced with the Opus codec.

Usage
Ventrilo is sometimes used by gamers who use the software to communicate with other players on the same team of a multiplayer game, or for general chat. This usage inspired the 2006 smash single "Vi sitter i Ventrilo och spelar DotA" by Swedish artist Basshunter.

Controversy

Flagship Industries Inc. has been involved in several copyright infringement cases as plaintiff.

See also
 Comparison of VoIP software
 Discord
 Mumble
 Roger Wilco
 Skype
 TeamSpeak

References

2002 software
Freeware
MacOS multimedia software
VoIP software
Windows multimedia software